Charles Robert Sydenham Carew JP (7 June 1853 – 23 March 1939) was a British Conservative politician.

Carew was the son of Reverend Robert Baker Carew, Rector of Bickleigh, Devon, grandson of Sir Thomas Carew, 6th Baronet (see Carew baronets). His mother was Augusta Elizabeth, daughter of Thomas Daniel. He was educated at St John's College, Cambridge. Carew served as a Justice of the Peace for Devon and sat as Conservative Member of Parliament for Tiverton between 1915 and 1922. He lived at Colliepriest House, Devon.

Carew married Muriel Mary, daughter of Sir John Heathcoat-Amory, 1st Baronet, in 1891. They had two sons and three daughters. She died on 4 March 1939, aged 71. Carew survived her by less than three weeks and died on 23 March 1939, aged 85.

Notes

References

External links 
 

1853 births
1939 deaths
Conservative Party (UK) MPs for English constituencies
UK MPs 1910–1918
UK MPs 1918–1922
Alumni of St John's College, Cambridge